Francis Courtenay, de jure 4th Earl of Devon, ( – 3 June 1638) of Powderham, Devon, was an English Member of Parliament. In 1831 he was recognised retrospectively as having been de jure 4th Earl of Devon, having succeeded his father in 1630.

Origins
Courtenay was the second but eldest surviving son of Sir William Courtenay (1553–1630), de jure 3rd Earl of Devon of Powderham Castle, Devon, by his first wife Elizabeth, daughter of Henry Manners, 2nd Earl of Rutland (1526–1563).

Career
He was MP for Devonshire in 1625 and possibly for Grampound in 1626.

Marriages and issue

Courtenay married twice. He married firstly, 7 November 1606, Mary (born 1586), widow of Nicholas Hurst of Oxton, Devon and eldest daughter of Sir William Pole (1561–1635), of Colcomb, Devon. They had no children.

He married secondly, by 1628, Elizabeth, daughter of Sir Edward Seymour, 2nd Baronet (c. 1580 – 1659)  of Berry Pomeroy, Devon, by whom he had issue:
 Sir William Courtenay, 1st Baronet (died 1702), married Margaret, daughter of Sir William Waller.
 Edward Courtenay, baptised on 17 July 1631 at Powderham.
 Francis Courtenay, baptised on 14 July 1633, married, 11 January 1658, Rebecca, daughter of Major John Webb of Exeter.
 James Courtenay, baptised on 18 January 1635 at Powderham.
 Elizabeth Courtenay

Death
Courtenay died on 3 June and was buried on 5 June 1638 at Powderham, Devon. He was succeeded by his eldest son, William. His widow later married Sir Amos Meredith, 1st Baronet of Marston, Devon. She died by 6 February 1664.

Notes

References

External links
 Venning, Tim; Hunneyball, Paul (2010). "Courtenay, Francis (c.1576-1638), of Powderham, Devon". In Thrush, Andrew; Ferris, John P. (eds.). The History of Parliament: the House of Commons 1604-1629. at historyofparliamentonline.org
 Devon, Earl of (E, 1553) at cracroftspeerage.co.uk

Members of the pre-1707 English Parliament for constituencies in Cornwall
Members of the Parliament of England (pre-1707) for Devon
1570s births
1638 deaths

Year of birth uncertain
Place of birth missing

English MPs 1625

English MPs 1626
Earls of Devon (1553 creation)